is a Japanese aristocratic kin group. The Takatsukasa was a branch of the Fujiwara clan and one of the Five regent houses, from which Sesshō and Kampaku could be chosen.

The family crest of Takatsukasa is peony.

History
The Takatsukasa family was founded by Fujiwara no Kanehira (1228-1294), who was the sixth son of Konoe Iezane; he was also the first to take this family name, named after the section of Kyoto in which the household resided. The Takatsukasa family, for the first time, died out in the Sengoku period following the death of Tadafuyu, 13th head of the family, in 1546. Later in 1579, with the assistance of Oda Nobunaga, the third son of Nijō Haruyoshi took the name Takatsukasa Nobufusa and revived the household. Nobufusa's daughter Takako married Iemitsu, the third Tokugawa shōgun.

In 1884, Hiromichi, the head of the Takatsukasa family, became a prince in the kazoku system. In 1950, Princess Kazuko, the third daughter of Hirohito (the Emperor Showa) married  Toshimichi Takatsukasa, but the couple had no children.

Family Tree

First Creation (1252-1546)

Second Creation (1579-present)

Takatsukasa-Matsudaira (Yoshii) family
Because of his sister's marriage to the shōgun Tokugawa Iemitsu since 1623, Nobuhira moved to Edo in 1650; Iemitsu welcomed his brother-in-law and granted him the rank hatamoto. Arranged by Iemitsu's successor Tokugawa Ietsuna, in 1653, Nobuhira married Matsuhime, the second daughter of Tokugawa Yorinobu; as a close relative of the Tokugawa clan, Nobuhira was later allowed to adopt the family name Matsudaira by the next year. During the era of Meiji, the family name was changed to Yoshii (吉井), named after the family's fief Yoshii Domain in Edo Period.

See also
 Japanese clans
 List of Kuge families
 Five Regent Houses

References

External links 
 Takatsukasa kamon at Harimaya.com

 
Japanese clans
Fujiwara clan